Ogovia is a genus of moths of the family Erebidae. The genus was erected by William Jacob Holland in 1892.

Species
Ogovia aliena (Holland, 1920) Ghana, Zaire
Ogovia alticola Laporte, 1974 Cameroon
Ogovia bolengensis (Holland, 1920) Zaire
Ogovia ebenaui (Viette, 1965) Madagascar
Ogovia pudens (Holland, 1894) Sierra Leone, Ivory Coast, Cameroon, Congo, Zaire, Gabon, South Africa, Tanzania, Zimbabwe
Ogovia tavetensis Holland, 1892 Cameroon, Zaire, Tanzania, Zimbabwe

References

Calpinae
Moth genera